Piggs Peak Airfield  is an airport serving Piggs Peak in the Hhohho Region of Eswatini.

Caution: There is a power line that runs along the east side of the runway, and crosses the approach/departure path at the south end. The crossing cables are unmarked.

See also
Transport in Eswatini
List of airports in Eswatini

References

External links
 OpenStreetMap - Piggs Peak Airport
 OurAirports - Piggs Peak Airport
 FallingRain - Piggs Peak
 
 Google Earth

Airports in Eswatini
Hhohho Region